Thomas Kenny may refer to:

Thomas Kenny (VC) (1882–1948), English recipient of the Victoria Cross
Thomas Edward Kenny (1833–1908), merchant and political figure in Nova Scotia, Canada
Thomas F. Kenny (1847–?), tanner and political figure in New Brunswick, Canada
Thomas J. Kenny (politician) (1863–1926), American politician who held office in Boston
Tom Kenny (born 1962), American actor, voice actor and comedian
Tom Kenny (hurler) (born 1981), Irish hurler
Tom Kenny (rugby league), rugby league footballer of the 1930s for England, and Salford
Tom 'Cork' Kenny, Irish journalist, editor and founder of the Connacht Tribune

See also 
Thomas Kelly-Kenny (1840–1914), British Army general
Kenneth Thomas (disambiguation)